Macedonia is a biographical comic book, published in June 2007 by Random House. The book was written by Harvey Pekar and Heather Roberson, with illustrations by Ed Piskor. It is based on Roberson's travels through the Republic of Macedonia.

Plot
Macedonia opens with Heather Roberson, a student of Peace and Conflict Studies at the University of California at Berkeley, arguing with a professor about the inevitability of war. Roberson argues that it is avoidable, while the professor argues that it is not. Roberson cites Macedonia, which avoided civil war unlike some other former states of Yugoslavia, as an example. Roberson decides to make this the subject of her thesis, and travels to Macedonia to carry out her research.

Once inside the country, Roberson sees the tense relationship between the majority Macedonians and the Albanians, the largest minority. She travels to the cities of Belgrade (in Serbia), Skopje, and Tetovo, conducting interviews with an ombudsman, professors, and a police trainer.

Production

Inspiration
Roberson was inspired to start on the project as a result of an argument with a professor about the inevitability of war. She wanted to know what had saved Macedonia, while other former Yugoslavia states around it were in civil war.

Collaboration
Roberson was in her hometown in Missouri, stopping there before going to Macedonia to carry out research for her thesis when she met Pekar. Pekar was there on the invitation of Roberson's sister, speaking at a showing of American Splendor, a film based on his comics. Roberson described her project to Pekar, who expressed interest in collaborating on a comic book. He expected a short story, but ultimately ended up with 150 pages of material. Describing the collaboration, Pekar said "It was one of the best working relationships I've ever had". Pekar would create preliminary drawings of each page, then passed them on to illustrator Piskor in Pittsburgh.

Reception
Macedonia received mixed reviews. A reviewer in Booklist stated the Pekar "skillfully 
prepared the book’s text and basic layout", but complained that Piskor's illustration was "stiff". Other reviewers however responded positively to Piskor's illustration, citing its "stylish, crisp feel". Some reviewers complained that the text overwhelmed the illustrations, leading it to feel more like a "lecture" than a graphic novel.

References

2007 works
Villard (imprint) books